Vrh pri Križu is a village in the Municipality of Žužemberk in southeastern Slovenia. It lies above the left bank of the Krka River northwest of Žužemberk. The area is part of the historical region of Lower Carniola. The municipality is now included in the Southeast Slovenia Statistical Region.

Church

The local church built outside the settlement to the northwest is dedicated to Saint Margaret and belongs to the Parish of Žužemberk. It is a medieval building that was restyled in the Baroque style in the early 18th century.

References

External links

Vrh pri Križu at Geopedia

Populated places in the Municipality of Žužemberk